Spain competed in the Junior Eurovision Song Contest 2021, held in Paris, France. National broadcaster RTVE selected Levi Díaz as the country's representative.

Background 

Prior to the 2021 contest, Spain had participated in the Junior Eurovision Song Contest on six occasions since its debut in the inaugural  contest. Spain won the  contest with the song "Antes muerta que sencilla", performed by María Isabel.

Artist and song information

Levi Díaz 

Levi Díaz (born 11 August 2008) is a Spanish singer from Cornellà de Llobregat.

Reír 

"" is a song by Levi Díaz, written by David Roma. The song was revealed on 18 October 2021, along with a lyric video recorded in the streets of Madrid.

Díaz said about the song: "Laughing is very important. They call me the forever smiling kid and we want to share a message of joy."

At Junior Eurovision
After the opening ceremony, which took place on 13 December 2021, it was announced that Spain would perform sixteenth on 19 December 2021, following Netherlands and preceding Serbia.

At the end of the contest, Spain received 77 points, placing 15th out of 19 participating countries. This is the lowest result Spain had achieved at the contest to date.

Voting

Detailed voting results
The following members comprised the Spanish jury:
 Miguel Linde
 Sonia Gómez
 Rafa Cano
 Carlos Damas
 Melani García

References 

Junior
Spain
Junior Eurovision Song Contest